Mu'minobod District or Nohiya-i Mu'minobod is a district in Khatlon Region, Tajikistan. Its capital is Mu'minobod, also known in Soviet times, from 1973 − 1991, as Leningradskiy. The population of the district is 94,700 (January 2020 estimate).

Administrative divisions
They are as follows:

Geography 
This district is situated in the mountainous southeastern part of Khatlon Region, and is bordering Afghanistan. The district spans 2,387 square kilometers.

History 
The district was established in 1973 within Kulob Oblast.

References

Districts of Khatlon Region
Districts of Tajikistan